Scopula pseudocorrivalaria is a moth of the family Geometridae. It is found in southern China.

References

Moths described in 1932
Taxa named by Louis Beethoven Prout
pseudocorrivalaria
Moths of Asia